The Riblet Tramway Company of Spokane, Washington, which operated from 1908 to 2003, was once the largest ski chairlift manufacturer in the world.

The company was founded by Byron Christian Riblet, who was born in Osage, Iowa, in 1865 and earned a degree in Civil Engineering. Arriving in Spokane in 1885, his first work was laying out railway and streetcar lines. He also built dams and irrigation projects.

In 1896, Riblet was contracted to erect an ore tramway designed by the Finlayson company at the Noble Five silver mine in Sandon, British Columbia, to assist in moving ore down Reco Mountain to the mill at Cody. Apparently Riblet thought he was coming to build a streetcar line. Even so, Riblet decided he could improve the mining tram performance. Over time, Riblet raised more aerial tramways in the booming mining district, building 30 in the next decade. Riblet returned to Spokane in 1908, after working in the Kootenays, to found the Riblet Tramway Company. The company, which specialized in mining tramways, built them in Alaska, Canada, the western United States, and South America.

Riblet built its first chairlift in 1938 at Mount Hood, Oregon. Byron Riblet died in 1952, but the company boomed with the  postwar rise of ski resorts. Skiing gained in popularity, and soon ski lifts became the major part of the Riblet Tramway Company's business. They built more than 400 lifts, particularly in Washington, Oregon, and California, and as far away as Australia, New Zealand and Chile; one secondhand American lift has also been relocated to Pakistan. They have the most double chair lifts operating in the U.S.

The company only built fixed-grip lifts, whose chair grip is woven into the haul rope rather than clamped onto it. But other technologies eventually proved more popular. In early 2003, the firm announced that it was no longer viable and would go out of business.

Installations 
Riblet chairlifts can be found in many places still in service, though the majority have been removed. The following tables contain those documented by liftblog.com as of September 5th, 2021. More Riblet chairlifts may be in existence, though some listed below may have already been removed. There is a total of at least 265 existing Riblet chairlifts and 268 no longer installed.

See also 
 Detachable chairlift:  the technological successor to the fixed-grip chairlift
 Magic Mile, Riblet's first chairlift

References

Sources

External links 
Company website
Liftblog.com

Aerial lift manufacturers
Defunct companies based in Spokane, Washington
Defunct manufacturing companies based in Washington (state)
American companies established in 1908
American companies disestablished in 2003
Manufacturing companies established in 1908
Manufacturing companies disestablished in 2003